Eilema nigrosparsa is a moth of the subfamily Arctiinae. It was described by Arthur Gardiner Butler in 1882. It is found in Madagascar.

References

nigrosparsa
Moths described in 1882